The Women's 400 metres at the 2011 World Championships in Athletics was held at the Daegu Stadium on August 27, 28 and 29.

The defending champion was Sanya Richards-Ross and despite her poor form earlier in the season, she ran 49.66 seconds in London just three weeks before the championships. The only faster athlete that year was Russian champion Anastasiya Kapachinskaya, who had run a personal best of 49.35 sec. Three-time 200 m world champion, Allyson Felix, was also challenging for the 400 m title, while Amantle Montsho (ranked third that year) had five straight wins on the Diamond League circuit. Jamaica's Rosemarie Whyte, Novlene Williams-Mills and Shericka Williams were also contenders, as was 2009 third placer Antonina Krivoshapka.

The event started in controversy when reigning Olympic champion Christine Ohuruogu was disqualified in her preliminary race for a false start.  2011 was the first year of a new IAAF rule allowing no leniency for a false start.

In the final, Montsho was a clear leader off of the turn, with Felix closing fast at the end to make the race close.  This was Felix's personal best. Not only was this Montsho's personal best, but also the national record for Botswana.  For the bronze medal, Anastasia Kapachinskaya was faster down the final 80 metres to pull away from Francena McCorory, who had run her personal best in the semi-finals.

After the championships, Kapachinskaya was disqualified for a doping violation for having stanozol and turinabol in tests held during the 2008 Olympics.  She received a lifetime ban.  In 2017, McCorory was advanced to the bronze medal.

Medalists

Records
Prior to the competition, the records were as follows:

Qualification standards

Schedule

Results

Heats
Qualification: First 4 in each heat (Q) and the next 4 fastest (q) advance to the semifinals.

Semifinals
Qualification: First 2 in each heat (Q) and the next 2 fastest (q) advance to the final.

Final

References

External links
400 metres results at IAAF website

400
400 metres at the World Athletics Championships
2011 in women's athletics